This is a list of Turkey women's international footballers – women's football players, who have played for the Turkey women's national football team.

List of players

Key to positions
 GK – Goalkeeper
 DF – Defender
 MF – Midfielder
 FW – Forward

References

 
Association football player non-biographical articles
 
Turkey
Football internationals
Women's sport-related lists